Mitapivat, sold under the brand name Pyrukynd, is a medication used to treat hemolytic anemia. It is taken as the sulfate hydrate salt by mouth. Mitapivat is a pyruvate kinase activator.

Mitapivat was approved for medical use in the United States in February 2022, and in the European Union in November 2022. The US Food and Drug Administration (FDA) considers it to be a first-in-class medication.

Medical uses 
Mitapivat is indicated for the treatment of hemolytic anemia in adults with pyruvate kinase deficiency.

Pharmacology

Mechanism of action 
Mitapivat binds to and activates pyruvate kinase, thereby enhancing glycolytic pathway activity, improving adenosine triphosphate (ATP) levels and reducing 2,3-diphosphoglycerate (2,3-DPG) levels. Mutations in pyruvate kinase cause deficiency in pyruvate kinase which prevents adequate red blood cell (RBC) glycolysis, leading to a buildup of the upstream glycolytic intermediate 2,3-DPG and deficiency in the pyruvate kinase product ATP.

Society and culture

Legal status 
On 15 September 2022, the Committee for Medicinal Products for Human Use (CHMP) of the European Medicines Agency (EMA) adopted a positive opinion, recommending the granting of a marketing authorization for the medicinal product Pyrukynd, intended for the treatment of an inherited condition called pyruvate kinase deficiency. The applicant for this medicinal product is Agios Netherlands B.V. Mitapivat was approved for medical use in the European Union in November 2022.

Names 
Mitapivat is the international nonproprietary name (INN).

References

Further reading

External links 
 
 
 

CYP3A4 inducers
Orphan drugs
Sulfonamides
Quinolines
Piperazines
Cyclopropyl compounds
Anilines